Lucy Desmond (17 April 1899 – August 1992) was a British gymnast. She won a bronze medal in the women's team event at the 1928 Summer Olympics.

References

1899 births
1992 deaths
British female artistic gymnasts
Olympic gymnasts of Great Britain
Gymnasts at the 1928 Summer Olympics
Olympic bronze medallists for Great Britain
Olympic medalists in gymnastics
Medalists at the 1928 Summer Olympics
People from Lambeth
Sportspeople from London
20th-century British women